Mary Lou Ridinger (born 1945 in Fort Worth, Texas) is an American archaeologist. She holds a B.A. in Latin American Studies from The University of Colorado at Boulder and an M.A. in Archaeology from the University of the Americas After her graduate studies, Ridinger lived in San Miguel de Allende, Mexico and worked on a number of archeological digs in the country, including the excavation preceding the construction of Mexico City's subway system. She is known for her discovery of the in-situ jade quarry sites in Guatemala that had been lost since the time of the Spanish Conquest of the Americas.

Discovery of Guatemalan Jade Sources
Ridinger is widely regarded among scholars as the first archaeologist to discover the in-situ locations of the pre-Columbian Maya jadeite jade quarry areas. In 1975, In partnership with her late husband Jay Ridinger, Mary Lou Ridinger discovered three distinct sources for jadeite in the Motagua river valley of Guatemala, and also discovered tools and other indications that pre-Columbian Maya artisans had worked the material at the source site.

In years that followed, Ridinger and her husband discovered new types of jade that had previously been unknown, uncovering in 1987 a dark colored jade with pyrite inclusions now dubbed "Galactic Jade" and followed in 1998 by the discovery of a lavender variety of jadeite.

Jade Enterprise in Guatemala
Jadeite crafts and jewelry is now a staple craft industry in Guatemala. In 1975, Mary Lou and Jay Ridinger opened Jades S.A., the first post-conquest jade workshop in the western hemisphere, and began training stone carvers to work with the very dense mineral. She is recognized by such organizations as The Explorers Club and the Marquis Who's Who as the founder of the modern jade business in Guatemala. Notable figures such as President Bill Clinton and actor Robert Redford have visited her business in Antigua Guatemala and commended her work. Jades S.A. is now frequently visited by foreign dignitaries as well as local government officials and houses a sizeable museum wing illustrating the history and timeline of the use of jadeite by the Maya and pre-Maya inhabitants of Central America.

Public Recognition
She has been featured in National Geographic (Sept 1987 Vol. 172 no.3), the Discovery channel (June 5, 1999, "The Mystery of Jade"), and numerous other publications and media appearances. She and her late husband Jay Ridinger's story has been featured in a recent book, Stone of Kings (2012) by Gerard Helferich.

Philanthropy
In 2008, upon a successful campaign to divert a highway project from running through portions of the Izapa archeological site, Ridinger and her sister Georgeann Johnson founded The Maya Conservancy, a 501c non-profit organization with the stated mission "to aid in the preservation and protection of Maya and Pre-Maya archaeological sites throughout Central America and Mexico, in the preservation and conservation of Maya Cultural Heritage, and in educational guidance and financial assistance to private and governmental bodies in these countries." The Maya Conservancy has notable Maya scholars on its board, such as Dr. David Sedat from the Copan project and Dr. Robert Sitler.

References

External links
 Mary Lou Ridinger's Personal Website http://marylouridinger.com/
 Mary Lou Ridinger's Business Website http://www.jademaya.com
 Mary Lou Ridinger's Philanthropic Website http://www.themayaconservancy.com
 NY Times Mention https://www.nytimes.com/1988/01/24/travel/a-mayan-past-a-latin-present-in-guatemala.html?pagewanted=2
 WSJ Review of Stone of Kings (Helferich 2012) https://www.wsj.com/articles/SB10001424052970203935604577066063066160448
 TEDx Talk http://tedxtalks.ted.com/video/Maya-Cosmology-the-Real-2012-Ma;search%3Atag%3A%22TEDxSanMigueldeAllende%22

1945 births
People from Fort Worth, Texas
American archaeologists
Living people
American women archaeologists